The Canton of Sournia is a French former canton of Pyrénées-Orientales department, in Languedoc-Roussillon. It had 1,277 inhabitants (2012). It was disbanded following the French canton reorganisation which came into effect in March 2015. It consisted of 11 communes, which joined the new canton of La Vallée de l'Agly in 2015.

The canton comprised the following communes:

Sournia
Arboussols
Campoussy
Felluns
Pézilla-de-Conflent
Prats-de-Sournia
Rabouillet
Tarerach
Trévillach
Trilla
Le Vivier

References

Sournia
2015 disestablishments in France
States and territories disestablished in 2015